John Patrick Power (16 March 1910 – 26 September 1988) was an Australian rules footballer who played with Melbourne and Collingwood in the Victorian Football League (VFL).

The son of policeman John Joseph Power (1873–1953) and Mary Elizabeth Power, nee Cull (1876–1966), John Patrick Power was born in Bendigo on 16 March 1910.

Notes

External links 

1910 births
1988 deaths
Australian rules footballers from Victoria (Australia)
Melbourne Football Club players
Collingwood Football Club players